LOUD are a psytrance / electronica / psychedelic music group consisting of Kobi Toledano and Eitan Reiter, both from Haifa, Israel. LOUD have been called "one of the hottest and most interesting groups in the world trance scene today."

Members
Eitan Reiter was born on December 3, 1982, in Haifa, Israel, the son of a classical guitar player. He became fascinated by the sounds of synthesizers and when he was 16 started making music on his computer using Impulse Tracker. 
 
Kobi Toledano was born on December 1, 1976, in Haifa, Israel. Since his youth he was interested in electronic devices, taking them apart and putting them back together. Kobi worked for years in a recording studio managing and producing young artists. He discovered trance music and Psychedelic music while attending rave parties in the early 1990s in the forests of Northern Israel. Kobi graduated from a leading sound school in the Galilee, northern Israel, and was the producer of a few psychedelic groups.

Music career
Kobi Toledano and Eitan Reiter have been producing  electronic music together since 2006, blending old school roots with new sounds.

In 2009 the group was invited by BPM College, the leading institute in Israel for sound and music production studies, to conduct an artist workshop. The success of the workshop led to an ongoing relationship with BPM.

In 2011 the group was signed to the English/South African label Nano Records and since then have released several recordings.

LOUD have collaborated and remixed, and have been remixed, by many artistes, including: Simon Posford, Art of Trance, Union Jack, Dr Motte – Founder of Love Parade Berlin (released on PAXXIZ), Sebastian Mullaert, Infected Mushroom, J.Viewz, Bluetech, Son Kite, Astrix, Perfect Stranger, Shulman, Prometheus, Captain Hook, and Ace Ventura.

In 2013 LOUD assisted BPM in the development of its BPM Remixed project. The success of this collaboration lead to similar projects.

Festivals
LOUD have performed in almost every country that holds electronic dance music. Among their international performances are:

Discography

Studio albums

Some Kind of Creativity
(November 2006, Drive Records)
 All tracks written and produced by Kobi Toledano and Eitan Reiter.

Abstract
(January 2008, Drive Records)
 All tracks written and produced by Kobi Toledano and Eitan Reiter.

Free From Conceptual Thoughts
(May 2010, Drive Records)

 All tracks written and produced by Kobi Toledano and Eitan Reiter.

No More X
(April, 2012 Nano Records) 
 All tracks written and produced by Kobi Toledano and Eitan Reiter.
 Track #1 If... written and produced by Yaniv Shulman, Kobi Toledano & Eitan Reiter

Compilations

Private Lesson
(May, 2007 Drive Records)

LOUD - The Remixes
(July, 2011 Nano Records)

Singles/EPs
 "Digital Hippie", 2009, Drive Records
 "1/3", 2010, Drive Records
 "Engines On" (Perfect Stranger remix), 2010, Digital Structures
 "People Music Money Drugs", 2011, HOMmega HD
 "Genetic Lottery", 2013, HOMmega HD
 "Moroccan Roll", 2014, Platipus Music

Appearances

Collaborations & Side Projects

Kobi Toledano
 With Samuel Wallerstein (aka ON3): Chain Reaction

Eitan Reiter
 With Sebastian Mullaert (aka Minilogue): Eitan Reiter & Sebastian Mullaert 
 With Avishay Balter (aka A. Balter): Eitan Reiter & A. Balter 
 With Nadav Katz (aka Cuts): Unoccupied 
 Also acting in his own project under the name Eitan Reiter

Production equipment

Videos

References

External links
 LOUD's store
 LOUD's Beatport
 LOUD's label
 Eitan Retier official website

Electronic music duos
Goa trance musical groups
Israeli electronic music groups
Israeli psychedelic trance musicians
Israeli musical duos
Tracker musicians